Puygouzon (Languedocien: Puòggoson) is a commune in the Tarn department in southern France. On 1 January 2017, the former commune of Labastide-Dénat was merged into Puygouzon. It has a population of 3,340 inhabitants in 2014 (including Labastide-Dénat).

See also
Communes of the Tarn department

References

Communes of Tarn (department)